MZT Skopje Aerodrom is a basketball club based in Skopje, North Macedonia. The club competes in the Macedonian League and ABA League. The club's home ground is Jane Sandanski Arena, but due to small capacity, the matches in the ABA League and EuroCup between 2012 and 2014 were played in Boris Trajkovski Arena. Since the 2014–15 season, all matches are held in the renovated Jane Sandanski Arena.

In its history, MZT Skopje has won the Macedonian championship nine times, the Macedonian Cup ten times, and the Macedonian Super Cup four times.

The club was a founding member of the Adriatic Basketball Association in 2015. In November 2020, the club's shares were transferred to the Slovenian club KK Koper Primorska.

History

The beginnings (1966–1990)

KK Skopje was formed in 1966 by a group of enthusiasts, led by the first president of the club, Mile Melovski. The interest in basketball was high, and even though there were four clubs in Skopje, there was still need for more clubs. Soon after the club's establishment, a number of young players joined the club and started training on an open field in Avtokomanda. The first team roster consisted of Trpezanovski, Atanasovski, Strezovski, Lazarevski, and Domlevski, who was also the team coach. Two years later, the club became a member of the Macedonian League.
In 1971, Uroš Maljković was chosen to be the new president of the club, with Boris Sokolovski becoming the new head coach. After the reorganization of the leagues in Yugoslavia, KK Skopje gained the right to play in the Second League – South. In the first season in this league, KK Skopje finished seventh. In the second season, the team reached the First League qualifications. KK Skopje lost and due to leaving the field in Ivangrad, received a penalty of eight points for the next season.

KK Skopje got relegated again to the regional league and Taki Dzikov was selected to be the head coach. In 1979, the team finished first in the Macedonian League and gained promotion for the Second Yugoslav League yet again. With this success, the factory Metalski Zavod Tito, or MZT, thanks to Jovo Panajotović, Uroš Maljković, and Slobodan Mucunski, one of the leading people of MZT, who became the president of the club started investing in KK Skopje. In 1984, MZT completely took the club under their wing, building the new Jane Sandanski Arena in Aerodrom. In 1986, KK Skopje, under the new name MZT Skopje and the leadership of Lazar Lečić, reached the Yugoslav First Basketball League where they competed for two seasons.

The team debuted in the Yugoslav First Basketball League in the 1986–87 season with coach Lazar Lečić, who was previously head of their "eternal rivals" Rabotnički. At that period, the most prominent individuals were Vlatko Vladičevski with an average of 16,4 points, Vojislav Zivčević with 15,6 points, and Darko Knežević with 14,5 points. There was also a significant contribution by the former player of Partizan, Milan Medić, and the former player of Crvena zvezda, Aleksandar Milivojša. In the fourth final of the play-off, Cibona eliminated MZT in two games.

Independence of Macedonia (1991–2008)
After the independence of Macedonia, MZT Skopje immediately became one of the leading basketball clubs in the country. In the mid-1990s, MZT Skopje had a few successful runs in the European competitions, the most memorable being the 1996–97 season when the team played in the Raimundo Saporta Cup. In this period, MZT was led by coach Aleksandar Knjazev, and the team defeated Real Madrid, Benfica, and Ratiopharm, and has therefore qualified for the 1/16 finals, without losing one match at home in Jane Sandanski Arena. The draw allocated that MZT Skopje was to play Porto, with the first match to be played at home. The home form continued when MZT Skopje managed to defeat Porto in Jane Sandanski. But the win was not enough, as Porto won at home by a bigger margin, ending MZT Skopje European season. In the Macedonian National championship, MZT was eliminated by Žito Vardar in the semifinal. In the next few seasons, MZT Skopje had a marginal role in the European cups, playing against teams like Žalgiris, ASVEL, Cholet, Split, and others.
In the domestic league, MZT Skopje had a few tries to get to the championship trophy, playing in the play-off finals six times, but the team did not manage to win the championship in this period. However, MZT won four Macedonian Basketball Cups in this period, in 1996, 1997, 1999, and in 2000.

Moments of downfall (2008–2011)

In 2008, after many years of the poor decision making of the then management of the club, the fans decided to start a boycott in order to change the entire set of the management team of MZT Skopje. In the summer of 2009, the entire management left the club, leaving the club in financial debt. Two weeks before the beginning of the season, MZT Skopje was left without players, coach, youth school, and sponsors. A day before the deadline for application of teams for the current championship, the Family Aerodrom fan group organized a march in order to save the club. As a result, the club was taken over by the Municipality of Aerodrom. Due to the financial problems of the club, it had the worst season since the independence of Macedonia, so MZT Skopje had to play in the play-out to secure its place in the league. MZT succeeded and therefore secured the place in the first division for the next season. In the next season, 2010–11, the club got new sponsors, there was a complete reorganization of the management set, and the junior school was reactivated, which had been defunct for eight years. All debts were repaid, and the team succeeded in entering the playoff semifinals, and the finals of the Macedonian Cup.

The club's first championship (2011–12)

After all the turmoil and upheavals in the past, after a long time, KK MZT Skopje formed a team which became a favourite for winning the first league title since its existence. Before the start of the season, an agreement has been reached with the ABA League, and the team participated in the 2012–13 ABA League. Aleksandar Todorov, who had previously been on the bench of MZT several times, was appointed as a new coach. Since the last season, the team has included Toni Grnčarov and Igor Penov, while the new signings were Ognen Stojanovski and Gjorgji Čekovski, as well as the foreign players Cade Davis, Noah Dahlman, and Igor Mijajlović. In the regular part of the championship, they won the first place, and the roster was completed with the coming of another player from Montenegro, an international player Nikola Vučurović. The first "exam" for the team was the Macedonian Cup, where the team defeated Feni in the finals at Boris Trajkovski Arena. Feni was also an opponent in the league finals; Aerodrom won the series 4–1 and became a champion of Macedonia on May 2, 2012, for the first time in its history.

Domination in domestic competitions, ABA League, and Eurocup (2012–2018)
MZT Aerodrom's debuted in the ABA League in the 2012–13 season. In its first official game in the Adriatic League, MZT won against Cibona in Zagreb, which was immediately followed by its first official victory at home over Široki Breg. In the last round, MZT had a chance to qualify for the Eurocup. It was necessary to defeat Krka in Slovenia, and for Cedevita to be defeated by the Široki Breg. The task was fulfilled by the Macedonian champions, but the qualification did not depend on MZT alone, and eventually MZT ranked seventh, with a score of 14 wins and 12 losses, thus ensuring its participation in the ABA League in the next season. The team has won the Cup of Macedonia, defeating Kumanovo in the finals, while in the league playoffs, MZT Skopje succeeded in making it to the title without a single defeat, achieving victories over Feni in the semifinals with 3–0 and over Kozuv in the finals with 4–0.

The 2013–14 season was historic for MZT and the Macedonian basketball. After a long time, Macedonia had a team which was a part of the group stage in the Eurocup. The newly named coach Vlada Vukoičić, who replaced Aleš Pipan, brought some new players, including Stefan Sinovec, Uroš Lučić, Justin Reynolds, and Macedonian international Aleksandar Kostoski. The team was drawn in the group with UNICS, Banvit, Maccabi Haifa, VEF Riga, and BC Kalev/Cramo. MZT finished in the last place in the group with one win against Cramo at home. 

Along with the performance in the Eurocup, MZT also competed in the ABA League. MZT appointed Zoran Martić as their new head coach. Instead of desired sixth place in the ABA League, MZT ended the season in ninth place. In February 2014, MZT won the National Cup by defeating Lirija in the final. After that, MZT won ten league games in a row. In the semifinals of the league, the opponents were again Lirija, which MZT eliminated with a score of 2–0 in series. In the final, MZT Skopje defeated "eternal rivals" Rabotnički. The series ended with a 3–1 victory, and MZT won the league for the third season in a row.
Prior to the 2014–15 season, many of the players has left the club, and Zmago Sagadin was appointed a new coach. He was sacked shortly after the season began, and was replaced by Vrbica Stefanov. Stefanov was also sacked during the season, and was replaced by Bobi Mitev. Mitev resigned after the series of defeats, and was replaced by Aleksandar Jončevski, who used to be an assistant coach during the mandates of all previous coaches. The elimination from the Macedonian Cup in the semifinals by Kozuv and the next-to-last place in the ABA League meant resignation for Jončevski. He was replaced by Aleš Pipan, who became the fifth coach in the season. In the semifinals of the league, MZT eliminated Feni Industries, while in the finals, the team defeated the Kumanovo team, winning the championship for the fourth time in a row.
Aleš Pipan was appointed as a head coach again in the 2015–16 season. After mixed performances in the ABA League regular season, the head coach Aleš Pipan was replaced by Aleksandar Jončevski. MZT ended the ABA League season in the tenth place. In domestic competitions, MZT won another cup and league "double", becoming the champions for the fifth time in a row.

In the 2016–17 season, MZT Skopje applied for participation in the Eurocup for the second time in the last four years. Emil Rajković was appointed as new head coach. After a few games, the coach position was taken up by former assistant Aleksandar Jončevski, but the season ended with Croatian coach Ante Nazor on the bench. The Eurocup campaign ended without a victory out of ten games. In the ABA League, the team defeated Krka in the decisive match in the last part of the season and was thus saved from relegation, finishing in 13th position. The team won their sixth consecutive league title against Karpoš Sokoli 3–2 in the final. Charlon Kloof was MVP of the finals.

MZT Skopje started the 2017–18 season with Aleksandar Todorov as new head coach. However, due to poor results, he was sacked in December 2017. In the same month December 8, 2017, Željko Lukajić was named as the head coach of MZT Skopje. During the season, there were big changes in the club with completely new management, new coach, and changes in the squad. After six years in the First ABA league, MZT got relegated with a score of 3–19. In February 2018, MZT won its nine Macedonian Cup trophy with a win over Rabotnički in the final tournament in Kavadarci. In the meantime Lukajić left the team, and for new head coach was appointed his assistant Gjorgji Kočov. In the Macedonian League MZT finished as the runners-up, losing to Rabotnički in the finals.

Seventh domestic title and ABA Second League (2018–19)
In the 2018–19 ABA League Second Division, MZT Skopje, coached by Gjorgji Kočov, finished in third place during the regular season. In the play-offs, the club defeated Spars Sarajevo 2–0 to reach the final, where they lost to Sixt Primorska (3–0). The club also lost in the ABA League promotion/relegation play-offs against Zadar (2–1), thus staying in the second division. In the domestic competitions, MZT was eliminated in the semi-finals of the Macedonian Cup against Rabotnički. However, MZT won their seventh domestic championship after defeating Rabotnički 3–0 in the final.

Name through history
The club was established in 1966 as the basketball department of the sports club Skopje. Later the names were changed quite a few times, from KK Skopje (1966–1984), to KK MZT Skopje HEPOS (1984–1992), to KK MZT Skopje (1992–1998), to KK MZT BOSS Skopje (1998–2000), to KK MZT Skopje 2000 (2000–2004), to KK MZT Skopje (2004–2008), to KK MZT FON University (2008–2009), and finally, to KK MZT Skopje Aerodrom (2009–present). Few times in the names of the team were included names of the main sponsors of the team. However, the club is best known under the name KK MZT Skopje.

Honours

Winning seasons

Macedonian League

Macedonian Cup

Macedonian Super Cup

Arena

Jane Sandanski Arena is an indoor sports arena located in the Aerodrom Municipality of Skopje, Republic of Macedonia. The arena has a capacity of 7,500. It is named after the Macedonian revolutionary Jane Sandanski. 

On 18 November 2012, it was announced that the arena will be completely demolished, with a new arena called Sports Centre Jane Sandanski planned to be built in its stead. On 14 February 2013, MZT Skopje held their last training in Jane Sandanski, with more than a thousand fans attending. The following day, the arena was officially closed and demolished.

In September 2015, west and east stands were upgraded by 500 seats. Now, the arena is home ground of MZT Skopje, RK Vardar, and ŽRK Vardar. Moreover, Sports Centre Jane Sandanski has fitness centre, aerobics centre, tennis and paddle tennis courts, playground for children, and exclusive sports store and fan shop.

Players

Current roster

Depth chart

Second team
For the reserves team of MZT Skopje, see MZT Skopje UNI Banka.

Squad changes for the 2022–23 season

In

Out

Former players
For a list of all notable KK MZT Skopje players, former and current, see :Category:KK MZT Skopje players.

Management

Current staff
 Club Owner: Aerodrom Municipality
 General Manager: Filip Gjorevski

Head coaches

 Boris Sokolovski
 Aleksandar Domlevski
 Taki Džikov
 Lazar Lečić
 Blagoja Georgievski
 Steruli Andonovski
 Aleksandar Todorov 
 Aleksandar Petrović
 Aleksandar Knjazev 
 Boban Mitev
 Janko Lukovski
 Marjan Lazovski
 Dimitar Manevski
 Mitko Lukovski 
 Vrbica Stefanov
 Vasil Kafedžiski
 Gjorgji Kočov
 Ante Dukovski
 Igor Gacov
 Aleksandar Jončevski
 Marin Dokuzovski
 Emil Rajković
 Darko Radulović
 Slobodan Ivković
 Vlada Vukoičić 
 Željko Lukajić
 Dražen Dalipagić
 Peca Jačimović
 Miodrag Baletić
 Aleš Pipan 
 Zoran Martič
 Zmago Sagadin
 Ante Nazor

Supporters and rivalry

MZT Skopje's fans, Family Aerodrom, were formed in spring 1997.

MZT's fiercest and long-standing city rival is Rabotnički. The rivalry started after the independence of Macedonia, and the matches between these rivals have been labeled as the "Eternal derby." So far are played 162 games and the mutual score is 71 wins for MZT Skopje and 91 for Rabotnički.

MZT Skopje in European Competitions

Korać Cup 1993–94

Raimundo Saporta Cup 1994–95

Korać Cup 1995–96

Raimundo Saporta Cup 1996–97

Raimundo Saporta Cup 1997–98

Raimundo Saporta Cup 1998–99

Korać Cup 2000–01

Eurocup 2013–14

Eurocup 2016–17

MZT Skopje in ABA League
Note: "DNP" indicates that the team did not compete in the league in that season.

Most appearances in ABA League First Division

Most points in ABA League First Division

Seasons
Key
R1 = First round
R2 = Second round
R32 = Round of 32
R64 = Round of 64
GS = Group stage
 Players in italics have left the club during the season.

References

External links
Official website
Team info at MKF
Eurobasket.com KK MZT Skopje Page
Supporters Website
MZT Skopje ABA info
MZT Skopje Eurocup info

1966 establishments in the Socialist Republic of Macedonia
Basketball teams in North Macedonia
Sport in Skopje
Basketball teams in Yugoslavia
Basketball teams established in 1966